Onryza is a genus of grass skippers in the family Hesperiidae found in China and Indochina.The genus was formed by Edward Yerbury Watson in 1893.
The contained species are
Onryza maga (Leech, 1890) China
Onryza meiktila  (de Nicéville, 1891)
Onryza perbella  Hering, 1918 (Parasovia perbella) China
Onryza siamica  Riley & Godfrey, 1925 North Burma, North Thailand, Laos

References
Natural History Museum Lepidoptera genus database

Astictopterini
Hesperiidae genera